The 1922–23 season was Galatasaray SK's 19th in existence and the club's 13th consecutive season in the Istanbul Football League.

Squad statistics

Competitions

İstanbul Football League

Standings

Matches
Kick-off listed in local time (EEST)

Friendly Matches

References
 Futbol, Galatasaray. Tercüman Spor Ansiklopedisi vol.2 (1981) page (557)
 1926-1927 İstanbul Futbol Ligi. Türk Futbol Tarihi vol.1. page(43-44). (June 1992) Türkiye Futbol Federasyonu Yayınları.
 Tuncay, Bülent (2002). Galatasaray Tarihi. Page (116) Yapı Kredi Yayınları 
 Atabeyoğlu, Cem. 1453-1991 Türk Spor Tarihi Ansiklopedisi. page(75).(1991) An Grafik Basın Sanayi ve Ticaret AŞ

External links
 Galatasaray Sports Club Official Website 
 Turkish Football Federation - Galatasaray A.Ş. 
 uefa.com - Galatasaray AŞ

Galatasaray S.K. (football) seasons
Turkish football clubs 1922–23 season
1920s in Istanbul